Myiasis is the parasitic infestation of the body of a live animal by fly larvae (maggots) that grow inside the host while feeding on its tissue. Although flies are most commonly attracted to open wounds and urine- or feces-soaked fur, some species (including the most common myiatic flies—the botfly, blowfly, and screwfly) can create an infestation even on unbroken skin and have been known to use moist soil and non-myiatic flies (such as the common housefly) as vector agents for their parasitic larvae.

Because some animals (particularly non-native domestic animals) cannot react as effectively as humans to the causes and effects of myiasis, such infestations present a severe and continuing problem for livestock industries worldwide, causing severe economic losses where they are not mitigated by human action. Although typically a far greater issue for animals, myiasis is also a relatively frequent disease for humans in rural tropical regions where myiatic flies thrive, and often may require medical attention to surgically remove the parasites.

Myiasis varies widely in the forms it takes and its effects on those affected. Such variations depend largely on the fly species and where the larvae are located. Some flies lay eggs in open wounds, other larvae may invade unbroken skin or enter the body through the nose or ears, and still others may be swallowed if the eggs are deposited on the lips or on food. There can also be accidental myiasis that E. tenax can cause in humans via water containing the larvae or in contaminated uncooked food. The name of the condition derives from ancient Greek μυῖα (myia), meaning "fly".

Signs and symptoms 
How myiasis affects the human body depends on where the larvae are located. Larvae may infect dead, necrotic (prematurely dying) or living tissue in various sites: the skin, eyes, ears, stomach and intestinal tract, or in genitourinary sites. They may invade open wounds and lesions or unbroken skin. Some enter the body through the nose or ears. Larvae or eggs can reach the stomach or intestines if they are swallowed with food and cause gastric or intestinal myiasis.

Several different presentations of myiasis and their symptoms:

Wound

Wound myiasis occurs when fly larvae infest open wounds. It has been a serious complication of war wounds in tropical areas, and is sometimes seen in neglected wounds in most parts of the world. Predisposing factors include poor socioeconomic conditions, extremes of age, neglect, mental disability, psychiatric illness, alcoholism, diabetes, and vascular occlusive disease.

Eye
Myiasis of the human eye or ophthalmomyiasis can be caused by Hypoderma tarandi, a parasitic botfly of caribou. It is known to lead to uveitis, glaucoma, and retinal detachment.

Cause

Life cycle
The life cycle in sheep is typical of the disease. The female flies lay their eggs on the sheep in damp, protected areas of the body that are soaked with urine and feces, mainly the sheep's breech (buttocks). It takes approximately eight hours to a day for the eggs to hatch, depending on the conditions. Once hatched, the larvae then lacerate the skin with their mouthparts, causing open sores. Once the skin has been breached, the larvae then tunnel through the sores into the host's subcutaneous tissue, causing deep and irritating lesions highly subject to infection. After about the second day, bacterial infection is likely and, if left untreated, causes bacterial bloodstream infections or sepsis. This leads to anorexia and weakness and is generally fatal if untreated.

Human vectors
There are three main fly families causing economically important myiasis in livestock and also, occasionally, in humans:
 Calliphoridae (blowflies)
 Some examples include Calliphora vomitoria and Calliphora vicina
 Oestridae (botflies)
 Cordylobia
 Sarcophagidae (fleshflies) Sarcophaga barbata are usually found in dead and rotting meat and animal excrement, which are prime environments for them. This is because their larvae are facultative parasites, as they feed on organic tissue and use the hosts' oxygen reserve.

Other families occasionally involved are:
 Anisopodidae
 Piophilidae
 Stratiomyidae
 Syrphidae

Specific myiasis
Caused by flies that need a host for larval development:
 Dermatobia hominis (human botfly)
 Cordylobia anthropophaga (tumbu fly)
 Cordylobia rodhaini (Lund's fly)
 Oestrus ovis (sheep botfly)
 Hypoderma spp. (cattle botflies or ox warbles)
 Gasterophilus spp. (horse botfly)
 Cochliomyia hominivorax (new world screwworm fly)
 Chrysomya bezziana (old world screwworm fly)
 Auchmeromyia senegalensis (Congo floor maggot)
 Cuterebra spp. (rodent and rabbit botfly)

Semispecific myiasis
Caused by flies that usually lay their eggs in decaying animal or vegetable matter, but that can develop in a host if open wounds or sores are present:
 Lucilia spp. (green-bottle fly)
 Cochliomyia spp. (screw-worm fly) 
 Phormia spp. (black-bottle fly)
 Calliphora spp. (blue-bottle fly)
 Sarcophaga spp. (flesh fly or sarcophagids)

Flesh flies, or sarcophagids, members of the family Sarcophagidae, can cause intestinal myiasis in humans if the females lay their eggs on meat or fruit.

Accidental myiasis
Also called pseudomyiasis. Caused by flies that have no preference or need to develop in a host but that will do so on rare occasions. Transmission occurs through accidental deposit of eggs on oral or genitourinary openings, or by swallowing eggs or larvae that are on food. The cheese fly (Piophila casei) sometimes causes myiasis through intentional consumption of its maggots (which are contained in the traditional Sardinian delicacy casu marzu). Other flies that can accidentally cause myiasis are:
 Musca domestica (housefly)
 Fannia spp. (latrine flies)
 Eristalis tenax (rat-tailed maggots)
 Muscina spp.

The adult flies are not parasitic, but when they lay their eggs in open wounds and these hatch into their larval stage (also known as maggots or grubs), the larvae feed on live or necrotic tissue, causing myiasis to develop. They may also be ingested or enter through other body apertures.

 Diagnosis 
Myiasis is often misdiagnosed in the United States because it is rare and its symptoms are not specific. Intestinal myiasis and urinary myiasis are especially difficult to diagnose.

Clues that myiasis may be present include recent travel to an endemic area, one or more non-healing lesions on the skin, itchiness, movement under the skin or pain, discharge from a central punctum (tiny hole), or a small, white structure protruding from the lesion. Serologic testing has also been used to diagnose the presence of botfly larvae in human ophthalmomyiasis.

Classifications
German entomologist Fritz Zumpt describes myiasis as "the infestation of live human and vertebrate animals with dipterous larvae, which at least for a period, feed on the host's dead or living tissue, liquid body substances, or ingested food". For modern purposes however, this is too vague. For example, feeding on dead or necrotic tissue is not generally a problem except when larvae such as those of flies in the family Piophilidae attack stored food such as cheese or preserved meats; such activity suggests saprophagy rather than parasitism; it even may be medically beneficial in maggot debridement therapy (MDT).

Currently myiasis commonly is classified according to aspects relevant to the case in question:
 The classical description of myiasis is according to the part of the host that is infected. This is the classification used by ICD-10. For example:
 dermal
 sub-dermal
 cutaneous (B87.0)
 creeping, where larvae burrow through or under the skin
 furuncular, where a larva remains in one spot, causing a boil-like lesion
 nasopharyngeal, in the nose, sinuses or pharynx (B87.3)
 ophthalmic or ocular, in or about the eye (B87.2)
 auricular, in or about the ear
 gastric, rectal, or intestinal/enteric for the appropriate part of the digestive system (B87.8)
 urogenital (B87.8)
 Another aspect is the relationship between the host and the parasite and provides insight into the biology of the fly species causing the myiasis and its likely effect. Thus the myiasis is described as either:
 obligatory, where the parasite cannot complete its life cycle without its parasitic phase, which may be specific, semispecific, or opportunistic
 facultative, incidental, or accidental, where it is not essential to the life cycle of the parasite; perhaps a normally free-living larva accidentally gained entrance to the host
Accidental myiasis commonly is enteric, resulting from swallowing eggs or larvae with one's food.  The effect is called pseudomyiasis. One traditional cause of pseudomyiasis was the eating of maggots of cheese flies in cheeses such as Stilton. Depending on the species present in the gut, pseudomyiasis may cause significant medical symptoms, but it is likely that most cases pass unnoticed.

Prevention
The first control method is preventive and aims to eradicate the adult flies before they can cause any damage and is called vector control. The second control method is the  treatment once the infestation is present, and concerns the infected animals (including humans).

The principal control method of adult populations of myiasis inducing flies involves insecticide applications in the environment where the target livestock is kept. Organophosphorus or organochlorine compounds may be used, usually in a spraying formulation. One alternative prevention method is the sterile insect technique (SIT) where a significant number of artificially reared sterilized (usually through irradiation) male flies  are introduced. The male flies compete with wild breed males for females in order to copulate and thus cause females to lay batches of unfertilized eggs that cannot develop into the larval stage.

One prevention method involves removing the environment most favourable to the flies, such as by removal of the tail. Another example is the crutching of sheep, which involves the removal of wool from around the tail and between the rear legs, which is a favourable environment for the larvae. Another, more permanent, practice that is used in some countries is mulesing, where skin is removed from young animals to tighten remaining skin – leaving it less prone to fly attack.

To prevent myiasis in humans, there is a need for general improvement of sanitation, personal hygiene, and extermination of the flies by insecticides. Clothes should be washed thoroughly, preferably in hot water, dried away from flies, and ironed thoroughly. The heat of the iron kills the eggs of myiasis-causing flies.

Treatment
This applies once an infestation is established. In many circles the first response to cutaneous myiasis once the breathing hole has formed, is to cover the air hole thickly with petroleum jelly. Lack of oxygen then forces the larva to the surface, where it can more easily be dealt with. In a clinical or veterinary setting there may not be time for such tentative approaches, and the treatment of choice might be more direct, with or without an incision. First the larva must be eliminated through pressure around the lesion and the use of forceps. Secondly the wound must be cleaned and disinfected. Further control is necessary to avoid further reinfestation.

Livestock may be treated prophylactically with slow-release boluses containing ivermectin, which can provide long-term protection against the development of the larvae. Sheep also may be dipped, a process that involves drenching the animals in persistent insecticide to poison the larvae before they develop into a problem.

Epidemiology
The most common infected animal worldwide is the domestic sheep, for more information see fly strike in sheep. This condition is caused by the blowfly (particularly Lucilia sericata and its sister species L. cuprina), especially where the weather is often hot and wet. Blowfly strike accounts for over A$170 million a year in losses in the Australian sheep industry, the largest such losses in the world. Given the seriousness of the risk, Australian sheep farmers commonly perform preventive measures such as mulesing designed to remove the most common targets for the flies. The docking of lambs' tails (another frequently-soiled area that flies target) is also commonly practiced by sheep farmers worldwide. Maggots also occasionally  infest the vulvar area, causing the condition called vulvar myiasis.

Such problems are not peculiar to Australia and New Zealand; they occur worldwide, especially in countries where livestock, particularly sheep, are kept under hot, wet, conditions, including most of Africa and the Americas, ranging from the cold temperate regions in the north, to corresponding latitudes in the south. Myiasis is also not restricted to sheep; screwworm flies (Cochliomyia hominivorax in particular) regularly cause upwards of US$100 million in annual damages to domestic cows and goats, though the impact has been heavily mitigated in recent years by the sterile insect technique. 

History

Frederick William Hope coined the term myiasis in 1840 to refer to diseases resulting from dipterous larvae as opposed to those caused by other insect larvae (the term for this was scholechiasis). Hope described several cases of myiasis from Jamaica caused by unknown larvae, one of which resulted in death.

Even though the term myiasis was first used in 1840, such conditions have been known since ancient times. Ambroise Paré, the chief surgeon to King Charles IX and King Henry III, observed that maggots often infested open wounds.

Maggot therapy

Throughout recorded history, maggots have been used therapeutically to clean out necrotic wounds, an application known as maggot therapy''.

Fly larvae that feed on dead tissue can clean wounds and may reduce bacterial activity and the chance of a secondary infection. They dissolve dead tissue by secreting digestive enzymes onto the wound as well as actively eating the dead tissue with mouth hooks, two hard, probing appendages protruding on either side of the "mouth". Maggot therapyalso known as maggot debridement therapy (MDT), larval therapy, larva therapy, or larvae therapyis the intentional introduction by a health care practitioner of live, disinfected green bottle fly maggots into the non-healing skin and soft tissue wounds of a human or other animal for the purpose of selectively cleaning out only the necrotic tissue within a wound in order to promote healing.

Although maggot therapy has been used in the US for the past 80 years, it was approved by the FDA as a medical device only in 2004 (along with leeches). Maggots were the first live organism to be marketed in the US according to FDA regulations, and are approved for treating neuropathic (diabetic) foot ulcers, pressure ulcers, venous stasis ulcers, and traumatic and post-surgical wounds that are unresponsive to conventional therapies. Maggots were used in medicine before this time, but were not federally regulated. In 1990, California internist Ronald Sherman began treating patients with maggots produced at his lab at the UC Irvine School of Medicine. Sherman went on to co-found Monarch Labs in 2005, which UC Irvine contracted to produce maggots for Sherman's own continuing clinical research on myiasis at the university. Monarch Labs also sells maggots to hospitals and other medical practices, the first US commercial supplier to do so since the last one closed in 1935.

In the US, demand for these fly larvae doubled after the FDA ruling. Maggot therapy is now used in more than 300 sites across the country. The American Medical Association and Centers for Medicare and Medicaid Services recently clarified the reimbursement guidelines to the wound care community for medicinal maggots, and this therapy may soon be covered by insurance. The larvae of the green bottle fly (a type of blow-fly) are now used exclusively for this purpose, since they preferentially devour only necrotic tissue, leaving healthy tissue intact. This is an important distinction, as most other major varieties of myiasitic fly larvae attack both live and dead wound tissue indiscriminately, effectively negating their benefit in non-harmful wound debridement. Medicinal maggots are placed on the wound and covered with a sterile dressing of gauze and nylon mesh. However, too many larvae placed on the wound could result in healthy tissue being eaten, efficiently creating a new wound, rendering it as a type of myiasis.

History
Maggot therapy has a long history and prehistory. The indigenous people of Australia used maggot therapy, and so do the Hill Peoples of Northern Burma, and possibly the Mayans of Central America. Surgeons in Napoleon's armies recognized that wounded soldiers with myiasis were more likely to survive than those without the infestation. In the American Civil War, army surgeons treated wounds by allowing blowfly maggots to clean away the decayed tissue.

William Baer, an orthopedic surgeon at Johns Hopkins during the late 1920s, used maggot therapy to treat a series of patients with osteomyelitis, an infection of bone or bone marrow. The idea was based on an experience in World War I in which two soldiers presented to him with broken femurs after having lain on the ground for seven days without food and water. Baer could not figure out why neither man had a fever or signs of sepsis. He observed: "On removing the clothing from the wounded part, much was my surprise to see the wound filled with thousands and thousands of maggots, apparently those of the blow fly. The sight was very disgusting and measures were taken hurriedly to wash out these abominable looking creatures." However, he then saw that the wounds were filled with "beautiful pink granulation tissue" and were healing well.

Maggot therapy was common in the United States during the 1930s. However, during the second half of the twentieth century, after the introduction of antibiotics, maggot therapy was used only as a last resort for very serious wounds. Lately maggots have been making a comeback due to the increased resistance of bacteria to antibiotics.

References

External links 
 Myiasis, reviewed and published by WikiVet
 Exotic Myiasis, University of Sydney Department of Medical Entomology
 Identification key to species of myiasis-causing fly larvae, Natural History Museum (London)
 Parasitic Insects, Mites and Ticks: Genera of Medical and Veterinary Importance: Botflies

Tropical diseases
Sheep and goat diseases
Arthropod infestations
Veterinary entomology
Parasitic infestations, stings, and bites of the skin